That's the Ticket is a 1940 British comedy film directed by Redd Davis and starring Sid Field, Hal Walters and Betty Lynne.

It was shot at Teddington Studios. The sets were designed by the art director Norman G. Arnold.

Synopsis
Two nightclub cloakroom attendants become entangled with an enemy spy ring in an adventure that takes them to Paris.

Cast
 Sid Field as Ben Baker 
 Hal Walters as Nosey 
 Betty Lynne as Fifi 
 Gus McNaughton as Milkbar Monty 
 Gordon McLeod as Ferdinand 
 Charles Castella as The Bull 
 Gibb McLaughlin as The Count 
 Ian McLean as Hercule 
 Ernest Sefton as Marchand

References

Bibliography
 Murphy, Robert. Realism and Tinsel: Cinema and Society in Britain 1939-48. Routledge, 1992.

External links

1940 films
British comedy films
British black-and-white films
1940 comedy films
Films shot at Teddington Studios
Films set in Paris
Warner Bros. films
Films directed by Redd Davis
1940s English-language films
1940s British films